"Indestructible" is the second single from Matthew Good Band's second studio album, Underdogs. The song peaked at #7 on Canada's Alternative chart. The song is featured on MuchMusic's Big Shiny 90s compilation. It continues to receive airplay on Canadian rock radio stations.

Charts

References

External links

1998 singles
Matthew Good Band songs
Songs written by Matthew Good
Songs written by Dave Genn